The 1999 World Music Awards (11th Annual World Music Awards) were held in Monaco on 5 May 1999. The 1999 World Music Awards was also prerecorded and shown on ABC on May 20, 1999.

Pop awards

Best Selling Pop Female Artist - Celine Dion
Best Selling Pop Male Artist - Will Smith

Latin awards

Best Selling Latin Artist - Ricky Martin

Regional awards

Best Selling Benelux Recording Artist - Lara Fabian
Best Selling British Recording Female Artist - Des'ree
Best Selling Canadian Recording Group - Barenaked Ladies
Best Selling French Recording Artist - Notre Dame de Paris
Best Selling German Recording Group - Modern Talking
Best Selling Irish Recording Group - The Corrs
Best Selling Russian Recording Artist - Philipp Kirkorov
Best Selling Turkish Recording Artist - Tarkan
Best Selling Middle Eastern Artist - Amr Diab

LEGEND awards

 Outstanding Contribution to the Music - Cher
 Outstanding Contribution to the Music - Janet Jackson

References

World Music Awards, 1999
Lists of World Music Award winners